Jean Revillard (22 September 1967 – 3 January 2019) was a Swiss photojournalist and winner of two World Press Photo awards in 2008 and 2009.

Biography

Revillard attended the School of Business and Engineering Vaud with Luc Chessex, Jesus Moreno, and Christian Caujolle. After graduating, he became a journalist for  Le Nouveau Quotidien and L'Hebdo.

In 2001, he founded Rezo.ch, which was the first online photography agency in French-speaking Switzerland.

In 2010, he became a photographer for Bertrand Piccard's Solar Impulse Project.

Jean Revillard died of a heart attack while filming in Huelgoat, Brittany on 4 January 2019.

Revillard won his 2008 World Press Photo award for his work on Calais migrant shacks. He won another World Press Photo award in 2009, along with a prize from the City of Prague.

References

1967 births
2019 deaths
Photographers from Geneva
Swiss photojournalists